The Bomb Party were an English rock band from Leicester. They have been described as "The Godfathers of Grebo".

History
The band formed in the early 1980s, initially as Farmlife by Andy "Jesus" Mosquera (guitar), Peter Swaine (vocals), Steve Gerrard (guitar), Laurence Wood (sax),James Hunt(bass) and Mark Thompson (drums), who met on a fine art course at Leicester Polytechnic.  They underwent lineup changes and then released one single under this name in 1982, "Susie's Party" (later covered by Yeah Yeah Noh); A second single on Dan Treacy's Whaam! label was withdrawn. In 1984 Farmlife split up, and Andy "Jesus" Mosquera (vocals), Steve Gerrard (guitar), Mark Thompson (drums) formed The Bomb Party, with Sarah Corina (bass). They took their name from a Graham Greene novel, debuting in 1985 with the Ray Gun EP on the Abstract label, the new sound described as "a Molotov cocktail of hardcore grebo gothability lying somewhere between The Cramps and Bauhaus". The bandmembers themselves rejected the "grebo (music)" tag, Mosquera stating "We're not grebos and we're not bikers or any of that shit. We're experimental. We are experimentalists but we don't have to say we're political and we credit our audience with enough intelligence to suss it out for themselves". The debut album Drugs appeared in 1986.  Signing to the Workers Playtime label, they released a second album, 1987's Liberace Rising, now featuring Leszek Rataj on guitar and keyboards, preceded by a compilation of their early Abstract singles, The Last Supper. A year later they signed to Normal records, releasing their most commercial record, a cover of The Archies' "Sugar Sugar" (featuring Voice Of The Beehive on backing vocals) followed in 1989 by the album, Fish.  A final album, Nativity #3 appeared on Artlos in 1990, the band split up immediately after it was recorded. The band played their final gig at The Powerhaus in London on 17 December 1989.

Thompson subsequently joined members of Gaye Bykers on Acid and The Janitors in the band G.R.O.W.T.H., who released the album For Lack Of Horses They Straddle Dogs. Mosquera reverted to a career in fine art. Corina joined The Mekons and, later,  Striplight (with Alex Mitchell of Curve).  She has also recorded with Bill Carter of Screaming Blue Messiahs.

Discography
(chart placings shown are from the UK Independent Chart)

Singles
"Susie's Party" (1982, 7", Dining Out) (as Farmlife)
"Big Country" (1983, 7", Whaam!) (as Farmlife) (withdrawn)
"Ray Gun EP" (1985, 12" EP, Abstract Records, 12 ABS 032) #32
"The New Messiah" (1985, 12" EP, Abstract Records, 12 ABS 035) #30
"Life's a Bitch" (1985, 7", Abstract Records, ABS 038)
"Pretty Face" (1987, 7", Workers Playtime, WP CS 001)
"Sugar Sugar" (1988, 7", Normal Records, NORMAL 93 T)
"Why Don't You Behave" (1989, 7", Normal Records, NORMAL 103 S)

Albums
Drugs (1986, Abstract Records, ABT 014) #18
Liberace Rising (1987, Workers Playtime, Play LP2)
Fish (1988, Normal Records, NORMAL 103)
Nativity #3 (1990, Artlos Recs, ARTLOS/EFA LP 01819)

Compilations
The Last Supper (1986, LP, Abstract Records, ABT 016)

References

English rock music groups
Musical groups from Leicester